David Louie (born 1962) is a Hong Kong auto racing driver.

Career

Louie competed in the final round of the 2007 FIA World Touring Car Championship at Macau. He drove a BMW 320i prepared by the Engstler Motorsport team. The car was not homologated due to its sequential gearbox, so he was not eligible to score any championship points. He managed a 25th place in race one and retired from race two. He had previously competed in Chinese and Asian Formula Renault.

Complete WTCC results 
(key) (Races in bold indicate pole position) (Races in italics indicate fastest lap)

* Louie was not eligible to score championship points

References

1962 births
Living people
Hong Kong racing drivers
World Touring Car Championship drivers

Engstler Motorsport drivers